Abu Zayyan as-Sa'id Muhammad ibn Abd al-Aziz( Arabic: أبو زيان السيد محمد بن عبد العزيز), was Marinid Sultan of Morocco from 1372 to 1374.

Life 
Muhammad Abu Zayyan ascended the throne as a minor on the death of his father, Sultan Abu Faris Abd al-Aziz. His father had befriended Lisan al-Din bin al-Khatib, former vizier of Muhammed V of Granada, and during Muhammad bin Abd al-Aziz's rule al-Khatib was safe.

Muhammed V sent two Marinid princes to Morocco whom he had been holding captive in Granada: Ahmad ibn Abd al-Aziz and Abdul Rahman bin Yaflusin, and supported them in taking control of northern Morocco.
Muhammad Abu Zayyan was succeeded in 1374 by Abul Abbas Ahmad and Abd-al-Rahman.
Abul-Abbas Ahmad (Mustanzir) became the Sultan of Fez, while Abdul Rahman became the independent Sultan of Marrakesh. 
Al-Khatib was imprisoned and in 1375 was strangled to death while in captivity.

References
Citations

Sources

People from Fez, Morocco
Marinid sultans of Morocco
14th-century Moroccan people
14th-century monarchs in Africa
14th-century Berber people